Dark Flag is the fourth studio album by American metalcore band Phinehas. The album was released on November 17, 2017, through Solid State Records, the band's first release through the label. It was produced by Matt Goldman and Daniel Gailey, the band's guitarist.

Composition
Dark Flag is a concept album about human rights abuse in North Korea. Originally, the band recorded the album in four with Sean McCulloch on vocals, Daniel Gailey on guitar, Bryce Kelley on bass, and Lee Humerian on drums. However, Humerian left the band during production of the record while they were also on tour. Gailey produced the album with Matt Goldman (Underoath, Copeland, The Chariot). Track 10, "Communion for Ravens", features guest vocals from Jimmy Ryan of Haste the Day.

Track listing

Personnel
Phinehas
 Sean McCulloch – lead vocals, artwork
 Daniel Gailey – guitars, backing vocals, engineering, mixing, production
 Bryce Kelley – bass, backing vocals
 Lee Humerian – drums, backing vocals (left during production)

Additional musicians
 Jimmy Ryan of Haste the Day – guest vocals on track 10, "Communion for Ravens"
 Luke Conway – additional vocals
 Lauren Gailey – additional vocals
 Alex Garmon – additional vocals
 Keifer Johnson – additional vocals
 Parry Kitt – additional vocals
 Joshua Landry – additional vocals
 Ben White – additional vocals
 Dustin Williams – additional vocals

Additional personnel
 Matt Goldman – production, vocal engineering
 Nicholas Morzov – drum engineering
 Troy Glessner – mastering
 Scott Baldwin Lee – vibe mastering
 Adam Skatula – A&R
 Jim Hughes – layout
 Sarah McCulloch – photography

Charts

References

Phinehas (band) albums
2017 albums
Solid State Records albums
Concept albums